Eucyclodes semialba is a moth of the family Geometridae first described by Francis Walker in 1861. It is found in Sri Lanka, the north-east Himalayas of India, Myanmar and Sundaland.

Description
The inner area of the wings is greenish, whereas the outer area is whitish. A conspicuous submarginal black spot is found centrally in the ventral side. The caterpillar is olive green with brown speckles. Anterior and posterior segments pale purplish brown. A double brown line is found dorsally. Pupa greenish with minute purplish-brown speckles. The host plant of the caterpillar is Loranthus.

Subspecies
Three subspecies are recognized.
Eucyclodes semialba angiportus Prout, 1932
Eucyclodes semialba viridior Prout, 1916 - Sri Lanka
Eucyclodes semialba semialba Walker, 1861 - Taiwan

References

Moths of Asia
Moths described in 1861